Banc Cambria is a proposed Welsh community bank currently under development and aimed to be operating in Wales. It was originally proposed for 2023, but later delayed.

Formation and structure 
The Monmouthshire Building Society is working with the Welsh Government and Cambria Cydfuddiannol Ltd (CCL) to form Banc Cambria by 2023.

The aim will be to develop a community bank across all of Wales, with the provision of retail banking services by 2023.

The Welsh Government has disclosed that 30 branches could be opened across Wales in the next decade. Social Minister for Wales, Jane Hutt stated to Senedd members, "It's going to be a mutual owned by and run for the benefit of its members". Banc Cambria will aim to provide a full banking service across all of Wales and differently to other typical banks, it will be owned and ran by its own members rather than shareholders.

In February 2023, Minister for the Economy, Vaughan Gething stated the bank would not be set up in 2023 as originally proposed, and was delayed due to the economic climate.

Naming 
"Banc" in Welsh for bank, whereas "Cambria" is the Latin name for Wales, being the Latinised form of the Welsh name for the country, .

References

External links
Banc Cambria on Twitter
Banc Cambria on Facebook

Financial services companies of Wales
Banks of Wales
Proposals in Wales